The 2021 European Short Course Swimming Championships (25 m) were held in Kazan, Russia from 2 to 7 November 2021 at the Palace of Water Sports.

Medal table

Trophy

Results

Men's events

Women's events

Mixed events

References

External links
 
 Results
 Results book

European Short Course Swimming Championships
European Short Course
European Short Course
Swimming competitions in Russia
European Short Course
Sport in Kazan
21st century in Kazan
International aquatics competitions hosted by Russia